"Angel" is an up-tempo ballad in English sung by Helena Paparizou. It is the first Swedish single release after the 2014 single Don't Hold Back On Love. The original song was written by Amir Aly, Henrik Wikström, Bobby Ljunggren and Sharon Vaughn. It is included on the album Ouranio Toxo. 
The song was released in Sweden digitally on iTunes & Vevo on April 24 by Lionheart.

Charts

Track listing

01. Angel – 03:04

02. Angel (Singback Version) – 03:04

Release history

References 

2015 singles
Helena Paparizou songs
Pop ballads
Songs written by Henrik Wikström
English-language Greek songs
2015 songs
Songs written by Bobby Ljunggren
Songs written by Sharon Vaughn
Songs written by Amir Aly